John Henderson Martin (born July 21, 1951) is an American film and television actor.

Life and career 
Martin was born in Turlock, California. He attended the University of Florida where he earned a degree in political science. Martin began his screen career in 1980 in billboards, print and commercials as a Winston man, Welcome to Miller Time and Ford trucks among others. Rat Packer Joey Bishop was his mentor teaching improv, and his first live acting performance was a monologue directed by George Clooney. He appeared in films El Norte, Black Roses and starred in television movies Stalking Back and Praying Mantis. He guest starred in television programs including The Love Boat, T.J. Hooker, Three's Company, Columbo and Archie Bunker's Place.

Martin played the role of lawyer Jon Russell in the soap opera television series One Life to Live from 1986 to 1989, reprising the role from 1991 to 1992. He appeared in General Hospital from 1991. From 1997 to 1999 Martin played the role of Hank Cummings in the soap opera Sunset Beach,  and he played Frederick Hodges in The Young and the Restless from 2002 to 2005.

In 2010, Martin joined the cast of Days of Our Lives playing the role of Bill Horton, and from 2013 to 2014 he played the role of Ron Mitchell in Mistresses. Martin also ran a private investment consulting firm for actors, directors, and rock stars from 1997-2011.

References

External links 

Rotten Tomatoes profile

1951 births
Living people
People from Turlock, California
Male actors from California
American male film actors
American male television actors
American male soap opera actors
20th-century American male actors
21st-century American male actors
University of Florida alumni